Saint Innocent may refer to:
Pope Innocent I
Saint Innocent of Alaska
Saint Innocent, of the Theban Legion

Saint Innocent, a bishop of Tortona
Saint Innocent of Irkutsk, bishop